Garry Stead (born 5 January 1972 in Holmfirth, England) is a former international speedway rider.

As a child Stead showed a real interest in speedway, being a regular supporter at the Shay watching the Halifax Dukes, and spent many years as a child learning to ride.

Career history

Cradley Heath and Stoke
Stead became a schoolboy grasstrack rider, winning the British Championship in his category numerous times. His speedway career started at a Bradford Dukes training school in 1987, followed by after meeting rides. Stead's first club was the now defunct Cradley Heath Heathens in 1988 where he was a junior before he moved to the Stoke Potters in 1989. He continued to ride in after the meeting races but during this season he broke his elbow. It was at Stoke that Stead had the opportunity to battle for a team place towards the end of 1990. He became a regular in 1991 and stayed there until 1992.

Newcastle
Garry moved to Brough Park in 1993 to be part of the Newcastle Diamonds outfit, scoring well but did not manage to get through the season unscathed as he ended up with a broken wrist and thumb. It was during his time at Newcastle that Bradford promoter Alan Ham became aware of Garry's potential, he moved quickly to secure his services in the 1994 season and paid £15,000 for him but loaned him back to Newcastle for the rest of the season.

Bradford, Sheffield and back to Bradford
In 1995 Garry became a fully fledged Bradford Dukes rider, cementing his place in the main body of the team and picking up a winners medal for the KO Cup. He also had a good individual year which saw him qualify for his first British Final and also progress from that round to the Overseas Final. The season was not without its disasters however and Garry picked up another injury, this time being a broken ankle towards the end of the season.

1996 saw Garry again qualify for the British Final and also found him surplus to requirements at Bradford after they signed  Australian Todd Wiltshire. A loan agreement was quickly arranged for Garry to join the Sheffield Tigers and that season saw Garry progress to heat leader status with Tigers. The following year Alan and Bobby Ham brought Garry back to the Dukes. 1997 was a good year for Garry, ending the season with an Elite League Championship winning team medal.

Wolverhampton
1997 also saw the end of Speedway at Odsal Stadium, the home of the Bradford Dukes, and in 1998 Garry joined the Wolverhampton Wolves on loan from Bradford Dukes as the Ham brothers still held his contract. His season did not work out too well with the Wolves as he never really got to grips with the track there, although he did yet again qualify for his third appearance in the British Final.

Hull
In 1999 Garry got a move back up North with the Hull Vikings and there he stayed until 2005 when their season came to an abrupt ending with two months remaining due to the promotion having financial difficulties, Garry would see the remainder of this season out by relying on guest bookings. It was during his time with the Vikings that Garry had most of his track success winning the Premier Trophy in 2000 and the KO Cup in 2001.

In 2002 Garry again qualified for the British Final and for only the second time in his racing career Garry progressed to the next stage being the Overseas Final only for him to give his place up and put his club first as there was a clash of fixtures.

2003 saw Garry pick up some Elite League guest bookings and the most notable one being the Poole Pirates, Garry was part of their Speedway Star KO Cup winning squad, the meeting at Poole saw him team up with Tony Rickardsson for a 5-1 which is still talked about by Poole fans still today.

Garry's most successful season was in 2004 as the Vikings did the treble winning the Premier League, the Knockout Cup and the Young Shield.

During 2005, Garry was sidelined for a month during June and July when in a racing accident he received an injury to his lower back with internal bruising, this was the first time he had been out injured since the 2000 season when he broke his arm.

Workington
The 2006 season saw Garry again change clubs as Hull had closed and the Sheffield Tigers promotion quickly snapped up the Hull riders. Garry was told that he was not in Sheffield's plans for that season and he could talk to other clubs. Garry was signed by the
Workington Comets where was made team captain. Garry could not have been more suited with this move as Derwent Park was one of his favourite tracks reminding him in a way of the old Odsal track. It looked as if as it was probably the best prepared he had been for a long time (new bikes, kevlars and sponsors) and saw him reach the British Final at Belle Vue for only the fifth time in his career. The year started really well for him with his form dwindling mid season due to him becoming disillusioned with the Workington team management, he bounced back to finish off the year in fine form and led the Comets to the Premier League Fours Championship title and earned himself another medal.

Back to Stoke
Towards the end of 2006 the Comets told Garry that he would not feature in their team plans in 2007 as they would be putting a team together from their own rider assets, Sheffield could not fit him in either and at one point it looked like Garry would miss the start of the 2007 season until Promoter Dave Tattum came in to take Garry on loan to the Stoke Potters for the second time in his career.

Garry started the season off really well top scoring in most of the meets, he came off at Workington his previous years club and damaged his ribs only for this to give him problems in the following weeks. Garry was now Captain of the Potters as team changes had been made due to the Potters poor start to the season.

Accident
On Friday 18 May 2007, Stead's racing career came to an abrupt end at Somerset, when a racing accident left him paralysed from the waist down.

Garry today is still very proud of the fact that he never missed a season since his speedway career started way back in 1987 as a raw speedway recruit. He hoped that he would return to ride for the Hull Vikings before his racing career ended but that was not to be. One of Garry's favourite moments from his career was when he guested for Poole Pirates in the 2003 Speedway Star KO Cup final and he combined with Tony Rickardsson for a 5-1. Poole went on to win with Garry being part of both meetings and receiving a winners medal.

References

External links
Video of Crash Halifax Courier website showing the crash.

1972 births
Living people
British speedway riders
English motorcycle racers
Workington Comets riders
Sheffield Tigers riders
Stoke Potters riders
Hull Vikings riders
Bradford Dukes riders